
Year 738 (DCCXXXVIII) was a common year starting on Wednesday (link will display the full calendar) of the Julian calendar. The denomination 738 for this year has been used since the early medieval period, when the Anno Domini calendar era became the prevalent method in Europe for naming years.

Events 
 By place 
 Europe 
 Charles Martel, Merovingian mayor of the palace, begins a campaign against the Saxons (in modern-day Westphalia) on the northeast frontier. They are subdued and must pay him tribute.
Moors under Uqba ibn Al-Hajjaj cross the Pyrenees into France. Uqba fortifies Narbonne and reconquers Avignon, Arles, Nimes. He then advances into Provance, and penetrates as far as Piedmont; he then heads North, and conquers Dauphiné, destroying the city of Saint-Paul, taking Valence, Vienne and Lyón, which he uses as a base to attack Bourgogne.
 Kormesiy, ruler (khagan) of the Bulgarian Empire, is deposed by the nobility. He is replaced on the throne by his son Sevar, who is a descendant of the royal Dulo clan.
 Felice Cornicola is appointed hypatos (Byzantine consul) and magister militum of Venice.

 Britain 
 King Swæfberht of Essex dies after a 23-year reign. He is succeeded by Saelred, a minor member of the Essex royal family.   

 Mesoamerica 
 The Mayan city-state Xukpi (Copán) is defeated by a rival city-state, Quiriguá. Xukpi leader Uaxaclajuun Ub'aah K'awiil ("Eighteen Rabbit") is deposed thereafter.

 By topic 
 Religion 
 Boniface visits Rome, and is made papal legate of the Frankish Kingdom. He establishes many bishoprics in Bavaria.

Births 
 Abu Yusuf, Arab jurist and chief adviser (approximate date)
 Chengguan, Chinese Buddhist monk (d. 839)

Deaths 
 January 26 – John of Dailam, Syrian monk (b. 660)
 May 3 – Uaxaclajuun Ub'aah K'awiil, Mayan ruler (ajaw)
 Áed mac Colggen, king of the Uí Cheinnselaig (Ireland)
 Asad ibn Abdallah al-Qasri, Arab governor
 Dluthach mac Fithcheallach, king of Uí Maine (Ireland)
 Fáelán mac Murchado, king of Leinster
 Maslama ibn Abd al-Malik, Arab general 
 Suluk, Turkic ruler (khagan) of the Turgesh
 Swæfberht, king of Essex

In fiction 
 In the fiction of H. P. Lovecraft, Abd Al Azred, Muslim-kafir scholar and scientist, is killed in Damascus city market. His treatise on religion, the Al-Azif, is published soon thereafter.

References